The American Wind Energy Association (AWEA) is a Washington, D.C.–based national trade association formed in 1974, representing wind power project developers, equipment suppliers, service providers, parts manufacturers, utilities, researchers, and others involved in the wind industry.

AWEA promotes wind energy as a clean source of electricity for consumers in the U.S. and around the world and has around 1,000 member organizations.

The group was succeeded in January 2021 by the American Clean Power Association.

Legislative efforts
AWEA staff lobby the U.S. Congress to promote policies encouraging investment in wind energy and provide statistics and data on the wind industry.  Additionally, they make policy recommendations and testify on various issues.

AWEA supports policies which it asserts will generate investment in the U.S. economy, improve U.S. energy security, and slow climate change, including extension of the federal Production Tax Credit (PTC) and Investment Tax Credit (ITC) for wind energy, establishment of a national Renewable Electricity Standard (RES), adoption of climate change policy that recognizes wind energy as a major near-term option for reducing greenhouse gas emissions, support for efforts to strengthen and expand the U.S. electric transmission system, and support for a strong federal wind energy research program.

Annual industry conference
AWEA hosts the annual WINDPOWER Conference & Exhibition, which is the largest annual wind conference and exhibition in the world.  WINDPOWER features an exhibition of wind energy technology, including large-scale components, as well as presentations on industry trends, technology developments, and renewable energy policy developments.

Wind Tower Standardization Efforts
In December 2009, AWEA coordinated with the Telecommunications Industry Association's Engineering Committee, to research and formulate recommendations to address the technical aspects of the design and maintenance of structures supporting small wind turbines based upon the approaches outlined in the existing communications tower standard.

Other 
AWEA's current CEO is Tom Kiernan. Kiernan was formerly President of the National Parks Conservation Association.

See also

Solar Energy Industries Association
Global Wind Energy Council
World Wind Energy Association (WWEA)
Airborne Wind Energy Industry Association
European Wind Energy Association
List of notable renewable energy organizations
Renewable energy in the United States
Wind power in the United States
 List of wind farms in the United States
 List of wind farms
 List of onshore wind farms
 List of large wind farms
 List of wind turbine manufacturers
American Council on Renewable Energy
Wind ENergy Data & Information (WENDI) Gateway
Telecommunications Industry Association

References

External links
AWEA Website 
CLEANPOWER Exhibition & Conference 
Into the Wind - AWEA Blog

Wind power in the United States
Renewable energy organizations based in the United States
Wind energy organizations